Cameron Mitchell Alldred (born July 25, 1996) is an American professional baseball pitcher in the Pittsburgh Pirates organization. He has played in Major League Baseball (MLB) for the Pirates.

Amateur career
Alldred attended Cincinnati Country Day School and played college baseball at the University of Cincinnati. After his senior year at Cincinnati, he was drafted by the Pittsburgh Pirates in the 24th round of the 2018 Major League Baseball draft.

Professional career
Alldred was drafted by the Pittsburgh Pirates in the 24th round, 714th overall, of the 2018 Major League Baseball draft. He split his first professional season between the Low-A West Virginia Black Bears and the Single-A West Virginia Power, pitching to a 1.80 ERA with 32 strikeouts in 20 total games. In 2019, he played for the Single-A Greensboro Grasshoppers, logging a 4–1 record and 4.20 ERA with 63 strikeouts in 60.0 innings pitched across 39 games.

Alldred did not play in 2020 due to the cancellation of the minor league season because of the COVID-19 pandemic. He split the 2021 season between the Double-A Altoona Curve and Triple-A Indianapolis Indians, recording a cumulative 4–0 record and 2.18 ERA with 59 strikeouts in 66.0 innings of work across 33 total games.

He was assigned to Indianapolis to begin the 2022 season. Alldred was promoted to the major leagues for the first time by the Pirates on May 11, 2022. He made his MLB debut the next day, striking out one batter over one scoreless inning in relief in a 4–0 loss to the Cincinnati Reds at PNC Park. On May 24, 2022, the Pirates designated Alldred for assignment and he was sent outright to the Indianapolis Indians.

References

External links

Living people
1996 births
People from Batavia, Ohio
Baseball players from Ohio
Major League Baseball pitchers
Pittsburgh Pirates players
Cincinnati Bearcats baseball players
West Virginia Black Bears players
West Virginia Power players
Greensboro Grasshoppers players
Altoona Curve players
Indianapolis Indians players